The Texas Rangers are a Major League Baseball (MLB) team based in Arlington, Texas. They play in the American League West division. From 1961 to 1971, the team played in Washington, D.C., as the Washington Senators, one of three different major league teams to use the name. The franchise relocated to Arlington as the Rangers in 1972. The first game of the new baseball season for a team is played on Opening Day, and being named the Opening Day starting pitcher is an honor which is given to the player who is expected to lead the pitching staff that season, though there are various strategic reasons why a team's best pitcher might not start on Opening Day. The Rangers have used 37 different Opening Day starting pitchers in their 60 seasons.

The Senators' first Opening Day game was played against the Chicago White Sox at Griffith Stadium in Washington, on April 10, 1961. Dick Donovan was their starting pitcher that day; he took the decision in a game the Senators lost, 4–3. In 1962, the team moved to District of Columbia Stadium (renamed Robert F. Kennedy Memorial Stadium in 1969). Opening Day starter Bennie Daniels earned the win in a 4–1 victory over the Detroit Tigers on April 9. Through their 11 years in Washington, the Senators started every Opening Day game at home. Their final Opening Day game in Washington was an 8–0 win over the Oakland Athletics on April 5, 1971, with starter Dick Bosman being credited with the win.

The team moved to Texas in 1972, and played their home games at Arlington Stadium. Their 1972 season opener was played on the road, but they played their first Opening Day game in Arlington on April 7, 1973, with Bosman taking the loss in a 3–1 loss to the White Sox. The Rangers' final Opening Day at Arlington Stadium occurred on April 8, 1991, when starter Nolan Ryan was handed the loss by the Milwaukee Brewers, 5–4. They moved into The Ballpark in Arlington in 1994, but did not host their first Opening Day at new facility until 1996. In the game, starting pitcher Ken Hill got the win in a 5–3 defeat of the Boston Red Sox. The stadium was subsequently renamed Ameriquest Field in Arlington (2004–2006), Rangers Ballpark in Arlington (2007–2013), and Globe Life Park in Arlington (2014–2019). Starter Mike Minor took the loss in Globe Life Park's final Opening Day game against the Chicago Cubs on March 28, 2019, a 12–4 loss. The Rangers played their first Opening Day game at their current ballpark, Globe Life Field, on July 24, 2020. Earning the win was starter Lance Lynn, as Texas beat the Colorado Rockies, 1–0.

The Rangers' Opening Day starting pitchers have a combined Opening Day record of 20 wins, 30 losses and 10 no decisions. In Washington, they had a record of 2 wins and 9 losses in 11 Opening Day starts. In Texas, they have 18 wins, 21 losses, and 10 no decisions in 49 Opening Day starts. They have an aggregate record of 15 wins, 19 losses, and 6 no decisions in 40 Opening Day starts at home. Texas starters have a record of 5 wins, 11 losses, and 4 no decisions in 20 Opening Day starts on the road.

Charlie Hough has the most Opening Day starts for the Rangers, with six, followed by Dick Bosman and Kevin Millwood (4); Jon Matlack, Kenny Rogers, and Nolan Ryan (3); and Cole Hamels, Rick Helling, Ken Hill, Ferguson Jenkins, Camilo Pascual, and Pete Richert (2). Bosman (1970–1973) and Millwood (2006–2009) made four consecutive Opening Day starts. Hough (1987–1989) and Ryan (1990–1992) made three consecutive starts, while Hill (1996–1997), Hough (1984–1985), Matlack (1980–1981), Pascual (1968–1969), and Richert (1966–1967) made back-to-back starts.

Three Texas Rangers Opening Day pitchers—Ferguson Jenkins, Gaylord Perry, and Nolan Ryan—have been inducted into the National Baseball Hall of Fame and Museum.

Table key

Opening Day results

Pitchers
Opening Day starting pitchers are listed in descending order by the number of Opening Day starts for the Senators/Rangers.

References 

Lists of Major League Baseball Opening Day starting pitchers
Opening Day starting pitchers